1991 World Cup can refer to:
 1991 FIFA Women's World Cup
 1991 Rugby World Cup
 1991 Alpine Skiing World Cup